Passiflora cuspidifolia is a species of passion fruit.

cuspidifolia